Circle of Two is a 1981 Canadian drama film starring Richard Burton. It was the last film directed by acclaimed film noir director Jules Dassin.  O'Neal - sixteen at the time of filming - appears topless in one scene.

The film has been distributed by B-movie company Troma Entertainment.  It has also been distributed under the title "Obsession." The film was shot in Toronto. Paintings shown in the movie are done by Toronto artist Harold Town. The film was almost universally ridiculed on its release, and has since then largely been forgotten.

Plot
A 60-year-old artist, who has lost his inspiration when his muse left him 10 years previously, regains it when he falls in love with a sixteen-year-old played by Tatum O'Neal.

Cast

Production
In her autobiography "A Paper Life", first published in 2004, Tatum O'Neal expressed unhappy thoughts about the film: "The premise of the movie was a little pedophilic and creepy, but the worst part for me was having to do a seminude scene. It's agonizing to watch-- this awkward young girl disrobing for the artist in his studio. Even from the back, my body language shows that they'd forced me to take my shirt off-- at least it's obvious to me-- and that I'm standing there miserably aware of my half-developed breasts."

Critical reception
Circle of Two received mostly negative reviews at the time of its release. Leonard Maltin's Movie Guide states that "Burton is OK, and Dassin does not go for the cheap thrill, but the result is slight and forgettable."

From People magazine's "Picks and Pans Review": Richard Burton has carried a film or two in his day, and he tries to tote this one along. Burton, 56, plays a Toronto artist whose muse and passion are revived by a liaison with Tatum O’Neal, 18, a schoolgirl who wants to be a writer. The premise is within reason, if barely. It’s harder to accept the obnoxious supporting characters—her parents and friends, his art world associates—and the actors who play them quite badly. Jules (Never on Sunday) Dassin’s direction and Thomas Hedley’s script are strained too. At one point O’Neal goes on a hunger strike when her parents won’t let her see Burton. “That old gentleman happens to mean more to me than anything else,” she wails. “The next time I eat, it will be with him.” While she’s a decent actress, O’Neal hardly seems attractive enough for the role, even though she records her first nude scene. Burton, meanwhile, gentlemanly underacts, yet his glances and monosyllables are so much more interesting than the rest of the movie they become a form of upstaging.

In his review of Chris Williams' "The Richard Burton Diaries" for Commentary, critic Terry Teachout notes that this film was considered a low point in Burton's long, once-esteemed career:As Burton grew older, his roles, with few exceptions, grew tawdrier, and he became known, like Laurence Olivier, for his willingness to do anything for money. He stooped so low in 1981 as to appear in Jules Dassin’s Circle of Two, in which he plays a 60-year-old artist who falls for the 16-year-old Tatum O’Neal.

By the time of his death three years later, his artistic reputation was in tatters.

External links

References

1981 films
1981 drama films
Canadian drama films
English-language Canadian films
Films directed by Jules Dassin
Films set in Toronto
Films shot in Toronto
Troma Entertainment films
1980s English-language films
1980s Canadian films